In November 2004, a cross-party group of British members of parliament tabled a motion in the House of Commons to impeach the Prime Minister of the United Kingdom at the time, Tony Blair for "high crimes and misdemeanours". The motion was never debated.

Viability

In the UK the most recent previous impeachment motion was made in 1848 (by Thomas Chisholm Anstey against the Foreign Secretary Lord Palmerston, who was accused of concluding a secret treaty with Russia). The campaigners first needed to establish that impeachment was still viable in modern politics. On 17 November 2004 the speaker ruled their motion in order and it was tabled for the next session.

Initial presentation
In August 2004, Plaid Cymru MP Adam Price commissioned and published the report: A Case to Answer: a first report on the potential impeachment of the Prime Minister for High Crimes and Misdemeanours in relation to the invasion of Iraq. The document was written by Dr Glen Rangwala (lecturer of politics at University of Cambridge) and Dan Plesch (Honorary Fellow of Birkbeck, University of London.)

Legal opinion
The campaign hired solicitor Phil Shiner of Public Interest Lawyers to represent their case. They have also asked Matrix Chambers to draw up a legal opinion. Matrix is known for its advocacy of human rights cases and for being the barristers' chambers of Blair's wife and Queen's Counsel, Cherie Booth. Booth was not involved in the case due to the obvious conflict of interest.

Drafting team
The drafting team for the motion was announced on 13 October 2004:

It appeared that the team would also draft the articles of impeachment. In earlier impeachment cases, this has usually been done after the motion, although it also occurred first in the case of Warren Hastings.

The drafting team completed the text of the impeachment motion on 7 November 2004.

Impeachment motion

The legal advisers to the Speaker of the House of Commons, Michael Martin, approved the wording of the motion on 17 November 2004. The motion was tabled for the first day of the next session (the day after the Queen's Speech) on 24 November 2004. However, the main three parties forbade their MPs from signing the motion and it was never selected for debate.

If the motion had been selected, it would have allowed MPs to debate matters that parliamentary language otherwise forbids. For example, on 17 March 2005, the anniversary of going to war, Price accused Tony Blair of misleading the house. Because this breached the rules of parliamentary language, he was required to leave the House for the remainder of the day. However, such rules only apply to debate within the House. In press and radio and television interviews, other MPs have accused Blair of lying to the House and to the British people, including then opposition leader Michael Howard.

See also
 Efforts to impeach George W. Bush

Further reading
A Case To Answer and the legal opinion in printed form by Spokesman Books,

References

External links

Political campaigns in the United Kingdom
Tony Blair
Blair, Tony
2004 establishments in the United Kingdom
Cross-party campaigns